Syzygium caryophyllatum is a species of plant in the family Myrtaceae.

It is a tree native to Sri Lanka and south India, where it grows in the mid altitudes of the Ghat regions of Kerala, Karnataka and Tamil Nadu. The fruit is edible.

The local name for the tree in coastal region of Karnataka is Kuntala/Kuntu Nerale.

References

 http://www.biotik.org/india/species/s/syzycary/syzycary_en.html

Flora of Sri Lanka
Flora of India (region)
caryophyllatum
Endangered plants
Taxonomy articles created by Polbot